Lalganj is an important town and Nearest City (39 kilometres Bihar Capital Patna),  
(60 kilometres Morden Old City Mehsi), (37 Kilometres North Bihar Headquarter Muzaffarpur) and river port situated in Vaishali district, Bihar.

History
It is part of Tirhut district and in 1869 the Lalganj Nagar Board was formed, at that time it was the 2nd place of Bihar in which there were 11 Commissioners and Hajipur and Sitamarhi. It lost 3 sq miles area during 1951 Census. Lalganj Municipality had 4 wards till 1972, 1981: 12 wards, 14 wards:2001 and 19 wards: 2011. Sharda Sadan Pushtakalya is one of the biggest libraries in Bihar.

Education
 G.A High School (este.1932)
 Bhagwan Shankar High School (este.1972)
 Guru Nanak Kanya High School (este.1983)

Notable Personalities
 Rameshwar Prasad Sinha, freedom fighter, member of the Constituent Assembly
 Shiv Nandan Singh, Freedom fighter
 Chandreshwar pd. Singh, freedom fighter and social worker

About
Lalganj is a Nagar Panchayat city in the district of Vaishali, Bihar. It is well connected to Hajipur, Patna, Sarai, Muzzaffarpur, Vaishali and Bhagwanpur.  The Lalganj city is divided into 24 wards for which elections are held every 5 years. The Lalganj Nagar Nigam has a population of 37,098 of which 19,671 are males while 17,427 are females as per report released by Census India 2011.

Population of Children with age of 0-6 is 5749 which is 15.50% of total population of Lalganj (NP). In Lalganj Nagar Panchayat, Female Sex Ratio is of 886 against state average of 918. Moreover, Child Sex Ratio in Lalganj is around 916 compared to Bihar state average of 935. Literacy rate of Lalganj city is 71.91% higher than state average of 61.80%. In Lalganj, Male literacy is around 78.19% while female literacy rate is 64.78%.

Lalganj Nagar Nigam has total administration over 6,339 houses to which it supplies basic amenities like water and sewerage. It is also authorized to build roads within Nagar Nigam limits and impose taxes on properties coming under its jurisdiction.

Key Popular tourist places near to lalganj - Ashoka pillar, Buddha stupa or vishwa shanti stupa, Mahavir birth place, Vaishali garh, Vaishali lake, Raja Vishal fort and many other temples

Lalganj has all the key public and private sector banks, malls, shopping complex, modern schools and basic hospitals with numbers of doctor clinics. It is one of the growing nagar panchayat in bihar due to its agriculture income and hard working people throughout India and the world.

Due to its fertile land all the key major crops like wheat, maze, rice, tobacco, vegetables and moong are grown.

Geography
It has an average elevation of 42 metres (137 feet). One of the famous temples in the city is 'Suryana Mandir' which is located in the middle of the city.
Lalganj is a growing town of the vaishali district of Indian state of Bihar. It is 20 km far from Hajipur in north direction. This town is located on the bank of Narayani river (Gandak River). Lalganj is 40 km far from the capital of  bihar. The state highway 74 is going through Lalganj.

Demographics
 India census, Lalganj (Hindi: लाल गंज, Urdu: لال گنج , Persia:لالگانج) is a town and a nagar panchayat with 61 village panchayats in the Vaishali district of the Indian state of Bihar. It is Located on The bank of Narayani River(Gandak River).

Direction board

References

Cities and towns in Vaishali district